The 1990 Estoril Open was a combined men's and women's tennis tournament played on outdoor red clay courts. It was the first edition of the event Estoril Open for the men (the 2nd for the women), and was part of the ATP World Series of the 1990 ATP Tour. It took place at the Estoril Court Central, in Oeiras, Portugal, from 2 April through 8 April 1990 for the men's tournament and from 16 July through 22 July 1990 for the women's tournament. Emilio Sánchez and Federica Bonsignori won the singles titles.

Finals

Men's singles

 Emilio Sánchez defeated  Franco Davín 6–3, 6–1
It was Sánchez's second singles title of the year, and the 11th of his career.

Women's singles

 Federica Bonsignori defeated  Laura Garrone 2–6, 6–3, 6–3

Men's doubles

 Sergio Casal /  Emilio Sánchez defeated  Omar Camporese /  Paolo Canè 7–5, 4–6, 7–5
It was Casal's first doubles title of the year, and the 25th of his career. 
It was Sánchez's second doubles title of the year, and the 28th of his career.

Women's doubles

 Sandra Cecchini /  Patricia Tarabini defeated  Carin Bakkum /  Nicole Jagerman 1–6, 6–2, 6–3

References

External links
 ITF men's tournament edition details
 ITF women's tournament edition details
 WTA tournament edition details